Cerro Saxani (also known as Saxani, Sacasani or Sazani) is a volcano in the Bolivian Andes. It lies north of the Salar de Coipasa.

References

Subduction volcanoes
Stratovolcanoes of Bolivia
Volcanoes of Oruro Department
Extinct volcanoes